Koduru is a village in Rowthulapudi Mandal, Kakinada district in the state of Andhra Pradesh in India.

Geography 

Demographics 
 India census, Koduru had a population of 479, out of which 234 were male and 245 were female. The population of children below 6 years of age was 43. The literacy rate of the village was 70.18%.

References 

Villages in Rowthulapudi mandal